Maximum is an Indian Hindi-language crime thriller film written and directed by Kabeer Kaushik. The project features Naseeruddin Shah, Sonu Sood, Neha Dhupia and Vinay Pathak in pivotal roles. Maximum was released on 29 June 2012.

Plot
Maximum revolves around two of Mumbai Police's top encounter specialists and their fight for control. The movie is set in Mumbai during 2003. This fight goes through a maze of politics, land deals, fake encounters and bad money. Pundit (Sonu Sood) and Inamdar (Naseeruddin Shah) try to overtake each other for power. Each kill the other's informers and divides the Mumbai police. Inamdar and his superiors frame Pundit and he gets suspended. Pundit comes back into the force with the help of a minister, Tiwari (Vinay Pathak). After the Mumbai bombing Inamdar is removed from his position and Pundit is reinstated. Meanwhile, Tiwari takes responsibility for the elections. One night when he is at home his accomplices are shot. He goes to check and finds the culprit to be Pundit. Pundit shoots Tiwari.

In flashback it is shown that while Pundit is travelling with his wife, Supriya (Neha Dhupia) shots are fired. In the confusion his car falls into a jungle. After that he shoots all the people and says that they were Niranjan's people. But when he comes back he realises that his wife is no more. Then it is revealed that Tiwari had an offer from the Home Ministry and 700 million from Pundit's enemies in exchange for killing Pundit. Instead, his men killed Pundit's wife. That was the reason Pundit shot Tiwari.

Before dying Tiwari confesses that he should not have done what he did. Pundit asks whether Subodh (his superior) knew of this. Finally Pundit shoots Tiwari.

Pundit hands over property documents to a reporter. The reporter tells him that there is no going back once this goes public. Pundit says that he does not want to return. Pundit comes with his daughter and the reporter to leave the city. Meanwhile, Inamdar and his men start shooting at them. Many people from both sides are killed. Meanwhile, the train is about to start. Pundit sends his daughter with his brother and the reporter to catch the train. She is unwilling to leave without him but finally does. An open shootout follows in which both Pundit and Inamdar are shot. A severely injured Pundit runs towards the train to meet his daughter. Before he can do so he is shot by Inamdar. Before dying he manages to shoot Inamdar. Pundit has a last look at his daughter before finally dropping dead.

Cast
 Sonu Sood as Inspector Pratap Pandit
 Naseeruddin Shah as Arun Inamdar
 Neha Dhupia as Supriya
 Nishikant Dixit as Advocate Suri
 Vinay Pathak as Tiwari
 Arya Babbar
 Swanand Kirkire as Bachi Singh
 Anjana Sukhani
 Amit Sadh
 Mohan Agashe as Sathe
 Rajendra Gupta
 Reet Sharma as Pratap's and Supriya's daughter  
 Hazel Keech as an item number Aa Ante Amalapuram

Box office
Maximum had a poor opening facing heavy competition from The Amazing Spider-Man. The second week also went poorly, as the much awaited Bol Bachchan released. On the third week, it almost disappeared from cinemas due to release of Cocktail and was declared a disaster grossing only ₹22.5 million.

Reception

Critical reception
Maximum garnered mostly negative reviews. Aniruddha Guha of DNA gave it 2 stars (on 5) and wrote – "Maximum ends up as a 'me too' among many RGV-inspired films in the last few years, even though that may not have been the intention. Sadly, there was potential". Janhavi Patel of FilmiTadka rated Maximum with 2 out of 5 stars and wrote in her review – "There is not much to remember when you walk out. The twist in the end is the saving grace of the movie, if we can call it that. Maximum does not deserve your time or money". Saibal Chatterjee of NDTV gave it 2.5 out of five stars and said – "Maximum isn’t a washout – not by a long chalk. It is well crafted and superbly acted. Sonu Sood in particular leaves a lasting impression as the police officer under fire for excesses committed in the line of duty. The cameos by Vinay Pathak and Rajendra Gupta are impressive. Sadly, the effort is maximum, the impact not quite so". Madhureeta Mukherjee writing for Times of India rated it with 3 out of five stars. Writing for Hindustan Times, Anupama Chopra once again gave Maximum 2 stars and commented – "Maximum has stray moments of power but the film feels like a Ram Gopal Varma rehash; mercifully though there are no cameras zooming into teacups like there were in Varma's recently released Department, which was also about power-hungry, corrupt encounter specialists". Social Movie Rating site MOZVO rated MAXIMUM at 1.9 out of 5.
Assistant Editor – Shadap Memon

Soundtrack

Music is composed by Amjad Nadeem Vikram and Devi Sri Prasad (Aa ante amlapuram), with lyrics penned by Raqueeb Alam and Shabbir Ahmed.

References

External links

 

2012 films
2012 crime thriller films
Indian crime thriller films
Films set in Mumbai
Films set in 2003
Works about law enforcement
2010s Hindi-language films